Christow Railway Station's previously known as Teign House was a railway station serving the villages of Christow, Bridford and Doddiscombsleigh in  Devon, England located on the line between Newton Abbot and Exeter. The station is/was actually in the parish of Doddiscombsleigh as the parish boundary is the River Teign.

History

Until 1943 Christow was the only passing place on the Teign Valley railway. The red brick station building was on the up platform. The down platform had a waiting shelter and at the far end of the platform was a raised timber built signal box. Originally, Christow was the terminus of the line from Heathfield, and at that time was called Teign House. During this time an extension, known as Teign House Siding, existed for loading stone.

The down loop was extended northwards by 370 yards in 1943 as part of the upgrading of the route for trains diverted from the South Devon main line. The sidings are now the home to The Exeter and Teign Valley Railway. They have a Toad brake van that has been converted into sleeping accommodation.

Passenger numbers reached their peak in the 1930s with seven daily services provided each way between Exeter and Heathfield. During World War 2 this was reduced to four trains in each direction, still with no trains on a Sunday. This was increased to five daily trains after the war. As stated, the line was sometimes used as a diversionary route if the South Devon main line was unavailable.

Freight
Two sidings were added behind the down platform in 1914 for Scatter Rock Quarry traffic and a 3/4 mile siding curved sharply away to the Bridford Quarry of the Devon Basalt and Granite Company in use between 1910 - 1931. The Bridford Barytes Mine also used the railway at Christow conveying Barium Sulphate to Exeter for milling; this traffic ceased in July 1958.
 
In the winter of 1960 and March 1961 severe flooding of the Teign washed away the track bed just beyond Trusham and this was never reinstated, thereby isolating Ashton and Christow stations completely. These stations were officially closed as of 1 May 1961 and the tracks lifted in the summer of 1963.

The present day
The station building is now a private house and the trackbed has been infilled to platform height.

The Teign Valley line may have a role to play in the future, as an alternative to the Devon's main line route along the Dawlish coastline which is vulnerable to stormy seas. The Council for the Protection of Rural England (CPRE) put together a feasibility study. Some of the old infrastructure is still in place - six of the 21 miles of track remained in 2009.

The Exeter and Teign Valley Railway has established a base in the old Christow station goods yard and plans to re-open the Teign Valley Line.

References
Notes

Sources

External links
 Christow old station building in 2011
 Film Footage

Disused railway stations in Devon
Railway stations in Great Britain opened in 1903
Railway stations in Great Britain closed in 1958
Former Great Western Railway stations